Andrew Liddell Aitken (25 September 1909 – 1984) was a footballer who played in The Football League for Liverpool and Hartlepools United. He was born in Newcastle upon Tyne, England.

References

English footballers
Liverpool F.C. players
Hartlepool United F.C. players
English Football League players
1909 births
1984 deaths
Association football goalkeepers